Yavuzlu, historically Tilhabeş, is a village in the Kilis District, Kilis Province, Turkey. The village is inhabited by Turkmens of the Elbegli tribe and had a population of 1,190 in 2022.

In late 19th century, German orientalist Martin Hartmann listed the village as a settlement of 40 houses inhabited by Turks.

References

Villages in Kilis District